Margaret Wilkins may refer to:

Margaret Lucy Wilkins, English composer and music educator
Margaret Wilkins, character in Jennings (novels)
Margaret Wilkins, character in The Family (1974 UK TV series)